Alvington may refer to:
Alvington, Gloucestershire
Alvington, Somerset
, a ship of the Royal Navy
West Alvington, a village near Kingsbridge in South Devon
Alvington, Somerton Park, the beachfront home of William Bickford (1841-1919) in Adelaide, South Australia